Irving B. Vincent (February 26, 1909 – August 25, 1977) was an American Negro league pitcher in the 1930s.

A native of Nashville, Tennessee, Vincent played for the Pittsburgh Crawfords in 1934. He died in St. Louis, Missouri in 1977 at age 68.

References

External links
 and Seamheads

1909 births
1977 deaths
Pittsburgh Crawfords players
Baseball pitchers
Baseball players from Nashville, Tennessee
20th-century African-American sportspeople